Mary Muehlen Maring (born July 27, 1951) was a justice of the North Dakota Supreme Court.  Mary Muehlen Maring was born and raised in Devils Lake, North Dakota. She graduated  with B.A. degree in Political Science and German from Moorhead State University in 1972 and in 1975 a juris doctor degree from the University of North Dakota School of Law.  She was appointed to the Supreme Court in 1996 and retired in 2013.

Career
1975-1976 - law clerk for the Honorable Bruce C. Stone, Hennepin County District Court, Minneapolis, Minnesota
1976-1996 - entered private practice of law and practiced law in North Dakota and Minnesota
1996 - appointed by Governor Ed Schafer to the North Dakota Supreme Court
1998 - re-elected to a ten-year term
2008 - re-elected to a ten-year term
2013 - retired

External links
Mary Muehlen Maring biography
North Dakota Supreme Court website

Justices of the North Dakota Supreme Court
University of North Dakota alumni
American women judges
1951 births
Living people
20th-century American women judges
20th-century American judges
21st-century American women judges
21st-century American judges